Pudukkottai district, Tamil Nadu, India.

A 

 Akkachipatti
 Alapiranthan
 Annamalaiyan Kudirupu
 Alathur
 Aliyanilai
 Amanji
 Amaradakki
 Amarasimendrapuram
 Ammachathiram
 Ammapattinam
 Andanoor
 Arasanagaripattinam
 Arasarkulam Keelpathi
 Arasarkulam Thenpathi
 Arasarkulam Vadapathy
 Aravampatti
 Ariyanipatti
 Ariyur
 Athangaraividuthi
 Athani
 Atthippallam
 Avanathankottai
 Ayingudi
 Ayinkudi
 Alangudi

C 
 Chettiyapatti

E 

 Edaiyar
 Edayapatti
 Eganivayal
 Egaperumagalur
 Embal
 Ennai
 Eraposal
 Erumbali
 Erundirapatti
 Eswarankoil

G 
 Gandarvakottai

I 
 Irrumbaanadu

K 

 K.chettypatti
 K.rayavaram
 kadappillaiyarpatti
 Kasankudi
 Kadayakudi
 Kadiyapatti
 Kalabam
 Kalikulanvayal
 Kallakottai
 Kallur
 Kammakadu
 Kannankarangudi
 Karamangalam
 Karur, Pudukkottai
 Kathavampatty
 Kattakudi
 Kattunaval
 Kavadukudi
 Keelachery
 Keelakuruchi
 Keelapanaiyur
 Keelathaniyam
 Keelkudivattadur
 Keezha pullanviduthi
 Keezhappatti
 Kilakudiammanjakki
 Killukudy
 Kodivayal
 Kodumbalur
 Kollanvayal
 Komapuram
 Kongudi
 Kothadaramapuram
 Kothirapatti
 Kudumiyanmalai
 Kulathur, Gandharvakottai
 Kulattur, Aranthangi
 Kulattur, Avudayarkoil
 Kulipirai
 Kummankudi
 Kundagavayal
 Kunnur
 Kurumpoondi
 Kurungalore

M 

 Madagam
 Manamelkudi
 Manavelampatti
 Mangalanadu
 Mangudi, Annavasal
 Mangudi, Aranthangi
 Mannakudi
 Maramadakki
 Maravanpatti
 Mathiyanallur
 Meivazhi Salai
 Melamelnilai
 Melapattu
 Melmangalam
 Melnilaivayal
 Melur
 Merpanaikadu
 Mimisal
 Mirattunilai
 Mookudi
 Mukkanamalaipatty
 Munasandai
 Muthukadu

N 

 Nayakkarpatti
 Nachandupatti
 Nagudi
 Nallambalsamuthitram
 Narpavalakudi
 Narthamalai
 Nattampatti
 Nattumangalam
 Nedungudi
 Neduvasal
 Nevathali

O 

 Okkur
 Onangudi
 Oorvani

P 

 Palavarasan
 Panampatti
 Panayapatti
 Panchathi
 Pandikkudi
 Pandipathiram
 Parambur
 Periyaloor
 Periyalur
 Perugadu
 Perumanadu
 Perunavalur
 Perungudi
 Piliyavayal
 Pinnangudi
 Ponpethi
 Poovalur
 Poovathakudi
 Pudunilaivayal
 Pudur
 Pullanviduthi
 Pulvayal
 Punginipatti
 Pungudi
 Punniyavayal
 Puthambur

R 

 Rajendrapuram
 Ramasamypuram
 Regunathapuram
 Rethinakottai

S 

  Pudukkottai sumpalur

]
 Sathivayal
 Sathiyamangalam
 Sattiyakudi
 Senganam
 Sengeerai
 Seriyaloor
 Silattur
 Sirumarudur
 Sithanavasal
 Sittankadu
 Subramaniyapuram
 Sunaiyakadu
 Sundampatti

T 

 Thachampatti
 Thalanur
 Thalinji
 Thanthani
 Theeyadur
 Theeyur
 Thekkattur
 Thenipatti
 Thennambadi
 Thirukkalambur
 Thirunallur, Annavasal, Pudukkottai
 Thirunallur, Aranthangi, Pudukkottai
 Thirupperundurai
 Thiruppunavasal
 Thiruvakkudi
 Thiruvengaivasal
 Thodaiyur
 Tholuvankadu
 Thondamandendal
 Thunjanur
 Thuraiyur, Pudukkottai

V 

 Vaadikkadu
 Vadakadu
 Valaramanikam
 Vallavari
 Vanniyampatti
 Vanniyan Viduthy
 Vavvaneri
 Vayalogam
 Veeramangalam
 Veerapatty
 Vegupatti
 Velivayal
 Vellanjar
 Vellanur
 Velvarai
 Vembakudi East
 Vembakudi West
 Vennvalkudi
 Vettanur
 Vettivayal
 Vettukadu
 Vijayapuram
 Vilanur
 Vilathupatti
 Virachilai

Pudukkottai district